The 2010–11 First Vienna FC season was the second consecutive season in the second highest professional division in Austria after the promotion in 2009. The coach Frenkie Schinkels was sacked on 29 August 2010 and former First Vienna player Alfred Tatar took over.

Squad

Squad and statistics

|-
! colspan="12" style="background:#dcdcdc; text-align:center;"| Goalkeepers

|-
! colspan="12" style="background:#dcdcdc; text-align:center;"| Defenders

|-
! colspan="12" style="background:#dcdcdc; text-align:center;"| Midfielders

|-
! colspan="12" style="background:#dcdcdc; text-align:center;"| Forwards

|}

References

Vienna
First Vienna FC seasons